Finnish gothic rock band HIM has released eight studio albums, one live album, eight compilation albums, one EP, twenty-eight singles, three video albums, and twenty-nine music videos. Formed in 1991 by vocalist Ville Valo and bassist Mikko "Mige" Paananen under the name His Infernal Majesty, the band broke up in 1993, but was reformed in 1995 by Valo and guitarist Mikko "Linde" Lindström. After being rejoined by Mige, as well new additions keyboardist Antto Melasniemi, rhythm guitarist Oki and drummer Juhana "Pätkä" Rantala, the band, now called HIM, signed to BMG, and released the EP 666 Ways to Love: Prologue in 1996. The EP charted at number nine on the Finnish Singles Chart, and in 1997, the band, sans Oki, released their debut album Greatest Lovesongs Vol. 666, which was certified gold and later platinum in Finland. In 2000, now with drummer Mika "Gas Lipstick" Karppinen and keyboardist Juska Salminen, the band released the album Razorblade Romance, which was certified double platinum in Finland, triple gold in Germany and gold in Austria. Its first single, "Join Me in Death", also charted at number-one in Finland and Germany, eventually going platinum in their home country and gold in Germany and Austria. Following the addition of Janne "Burton" Puurtinen on keyboards, HIM released Deep Shadows and Brilliant Highlights and Love Metal in 2001 and 2003 respectively. Both were certified platinum in Finland, as well as gold in Austria and Germany respectively.

After relocating to Los Angeles, HIM released Dark Light in 2005, which became the group's most successful album to date, charting in sixteen countries. With Dark Light, HIM also became the first Finnish group to receive a gold album in the United States. Dark Light was followed by Venus Doom in 2007, the making of which was marred by problems in Valo's personal life. Despite this, the album was certified gold in Finland and gave the band their highest chart position in the US at number twelve. After 2010's Screamworks: Love in Theory and Practice, which was once again certified gold in Finland, HIM went on hiatus as drummer Gas Lipstick took medical leave. Following several months of uncertainty, the band regrouped and eventually released the album Tears on Tape in 2013, which charted in nine countries. In 2015, Gas Lipstick announced his departure from the band to pursue other musical projects, and was subsequently replaced by Jukka "Kosmo" Kröger. On 5 March 2017, HIM announced that the band would be disbanding following a farewell tour in 2017.

HIM is internationally one of the most commercially successful Finnish bands of all time, with sales of over ten million records. HIM's music and their logo, the heartagram, have also appeared in several films and TV series, such as The Thirteenth Floor, Transformers, Jackass, CKY, Viva La Bam, LA Ink and Haggard''.

Albums

Studio albums

Live albums

Remix albums

Compilation albums

Box sets

Extended plays

Singles

Videos

Video albums

Music videos 

Notes
A^ No set video director; video consisted of tour footage.

Other appearances

References

External links 
 

HIM (Finnish band)
Discographies of Finnish artists
Rock music group discographies